Edward Everett Evans (November 30, 1893 – December 2, 1958) was an American science fiction writer and fan.
He married science-fiction author Thelma D. Hamm in 1953.

His works include the novels Man of Many Minds (1953), The Planet Mappers (1955), and Alien Minds (1955).  Additionally, a collaboration with E. E. "Doc" Smith (Masters of Space, 1976) and a collection (Food For Demons, 1971) were published posthumously. All of the novels have become public domain.

External links

 
 
 

1893 births
1958 deaths
20th-century American novelists
American male novelists
American science fiction writers
American male short story writers
20th-century American short story writers
20th-century American male writers